Kai Greene (born July 12, 1975), is an American personal trainer, artist, actor, and professional bodybuilder. He came in second place at the 2012, 2013, and 2014 editions of the IFBB's Mr. Olympia competition and has not competed in it since, though he never formally announced his retirement. He is often regarded as one of the best bodybuilders to have never won the competition.

Early life
Kai Greene was born in the Brooklyn borough of New York City on July 12, 1975. From the age of six, he was raised in foster care and residential treatment centers in Brooklyn. According to his online biography, his rapid physical growth and development drew the attention of his seventh grade English teacher, and since his behavior in school was troublesome, he was encouraged to enter teenage bodybuilding competitions as an outlet.

Bodybuilding career

NPC
Greene became an enthusiastic bodybuilder when he worked at Johnny Lats Gym in New York City, where he began training with personal trainer Jakob Panotas in 1996. He competed in the National Physique Committee (NPC) aiming to move into the IFBB. He perceives his success in the NPC as mixed. Although he won the 1999 NPC Team Universe, afterward he took a five-year break from competitions, before re-emerging in the 2004 NPC Team Universe contest, which he won again. This victory qualified him for a career as an IFBB when his professional career started as bodybuilder.

New York Pro & Mr. Olympia
In 2011, Greene began working with preparation coach George Farah and placed 1st in the 2011 New York Pro Championship. His 3rd place finish at Mr. Olympia in 2011 qualified him for the 2012 contest, so he did not compete at the 2012 New York Pro in order to focus on Mr. Olympia. He placed 2nd in the 2012 Mr. Olympia, the 2013 Mr. Olympia, and the 2014 Mr. Olympia.

Greene did not compete in the 2015 Mr. Olympia due to unknown circumstances, and issued a statement to say that "there is a lot more going on behind the scenes that [he] cannot discuss". Olympia officials allegedly denied any claims that he was banned from competing, but did confirm that he did not register and had been reminded to register several times since May of that year. Greene did request an extension on the registration period and was given an extra two months, but he did not meet this deadline either.

Greene won the 2016 Arnold Classic, which he had also won in 2009 and 2010, but has not competed since. In June 2017, he was given a special offer to compete in that year's Mr. Olympia competition without having to re-qualify, which he declined.

Documentaries
In 2009, Greene worked with director Mike Pulcinella to release Overkill, which documented his preparation for his first appearance at the 2009 Olympia. In 2010, he reunited with Pulcinella to film the sequel Redemption, showcasing his training and philosophies for the 2010 Arnold Classic, which he won for the second year in a row. He features in the 2013 film Generation Iron, detailing the lead up to and events of the 2012 Mr. Olympia competition.  He was also featured in the sequels Generation Iron 2 and Generation Iron 3.

Technique
Greene has often discussed the "mind-muscle connection". In an article published by Flex as part of his "Top Ten Big Back Principles", he explained, "The mind-muscle connection is the number one factor in training. You develop it over time by posing your muscle, and also by paying close attention to how your muscles feel when you work them. Eventually, you get to where your mind can read the feedback your muscles are providing, and your muscles can react to the stimulus your mind is providing. Practice posing between sets or anytime. And feel your muscles working throughout your sets. Eventually, your mind and muscles will speak the same language and communicate back and forth."

Sponsors and endorsements
Greene was sponsored by Flex. He launched a supplement brand called Dynamik Muscle in 2015, and a training program called The 5P in May 2016. The latter is named after the acronym for his motto, "Proper Preparation Prevents Poor Performance". He is sponsored by sportswear company Ryderwear, who have released lines of signature clothing and footwear in his name, and he signed a deal with sports supplement and clothing company REDCON1 in 2020.

Other work

Acting

Greene portrayed a male stripper in the 2015 comedy film College Debts. In November 2016, he travelled to the Chinese province of Guizhou to start filming for the 2018 martial arts film Crazy Fist. He played a villain who fights the protagonist in an arena during the film's opening sequence. In January 2017, it was announced that Greene had signed with The Gersh Agency. In 2017, he played Funshine in the second season of the Netflix sci-fi series Stranger Things. He appeared in the Indian action-thriller film Pogaru in 2021.

Art
Greene is an avid artist who often creates self-portraits to help himself build and maintain his ideal physique. In August 2011, he exhibited some of his work to the public; at the exhibition, he stated, "As a professional bodybuilder, I'm a master sculptor. The art show made me realize that I've always been an artist: my medium the human physique. My life is what I make it, just like the art I've produced on canvas and on stage. This art show makes this statement. I'm celebrating some personal accomplishments and my own artistic expression."

Podcasting
In November 2015, Greene and fitness model Krystal Lavenne began co-hosting a weekly podcast titled Generation Iron, in which they discussed various topics while answering questions sent in by fans. Greene left the podcast at an unknown point in time.

In October 2020, Greene began hosting his own podcast called Getting It Done.

Other

In 2021, Greene became the face of a gaming cryptocurrency called Grapefruit Supercoin.

Contest history

1994 NGA American Nationals
1996 WNBF Pro Natural Worlds – 1st
1997 NPC Team Universe Championships – 2nd
1998 NPC Team Universe Championships – 3rd
1999 World Amateur Championships – 6th
1999 NPC Team Universe Championships – 1st
2005 New York Pro – 14th
2006 Superman Pro – 20th
2006 Shawn Ray Colorado Pro/Am Classic – 14th
2007 New York Pro – 6th
2007 Keystone Pro Classic – 3rd
2007 Shawn Ray Colorado Pro/Am Classic – 1st
2008 New York Pro – 1st
2008 Arnold Classic – 3rd
2009 Australian Pro Grand Prix – 1st
2009 Arnold Classic – 1st
2009 Mr. Olympia – 4th
2010 Arnold Classic – 1st
2010 Australian Pro Grand Prix – 1st
2010 Mr. Olympia – 7th
2011 New York Pro – 1st
2011 Mr. Olympia – 3rd
2011 Sheru Classic – 3rd
2012 Mr. Olympia – 2nd
2012 Sheru Classic – 2nd
2013 Mr. Olympia – 2nd
2013 Arnold Classic Europe – 2nd
2013 EVL's Prague Pro – 1st
2014 Mr. Olympia – 2nd
2016 Arnold Classic – 1st
2016 Arnold Classic Australia – 1st
2016 Arnold Classic Brazil – 1st

References

External links

Kai Greene's possible participation in OLYMPIA’19

1975 births
Living people
African-American bodybuilders
Professional bodybuilders
People from Brooklyn
21st-century African-American sportspeople
20th-century African-American sportspeople